Amos Davis (August 15, 1794 – June 11, 1835) was a member of the United States House of Representatives from Kentucky. He was born in Mount Sterling, Kentucky, where he completed preparatory studies. Later, he studied law and was admitted to the bar and commenced practice in Mount Sterling, Kentucky. He also served as sheriff of Montgomery County, Kentucky.

Davis was a member of the Kentucky House of Representatives in 1819, 1825, 1827 and 1828. He was an unsuccessful candidate for election to the Twentieth and Twenty-second Congresses but was elected as an Anti-Jacksonian to the Twenty-third Congress (March 4, 1833 – March 3, 1835). While he was a candidate for reelection, he died in Owingsville, Kentucky, while campaigning in 1835. He was buried in the City Cemetery, Mount Sterling, Kentucky. His brother, Garrett Davis, served as a member of the United States Senate.

References

1794 births
1835 deaths
Kentucky lawyers
Members of the Kentucky House of Representatives
19th-century American politicians
People from Mount Sterling, Kentucky
National Republican Party members of the United States House of Representatives from Kentucky
19th-century American lawyers